Ezerets is a village in Kresna Municipality, Blagoevgrad Province, Bulgaria.

Ezerets Knoll on Graham Land, Antarctica is named after the village.

References

Villages in Blagoevgrad Province